The Lack (stylized as LACK) is a table manufactured by IKEA since 1981.

Modifications 
Various third-party modifications to the product have been published. They include:

 The Lackrack, a 19-inch rack
 Dog table and other table customizations
 Closet (by stacking LACK tables)

References 

IKEA products
Individual models of furniture